CJWL-FM (98.5 MHz Lite 98.5) is a Canadian radio station in Ottawa, Ontario. It is owned by Evanov Communications and broadcasts a soft adult contemporary format (with evening specialty shows focusing on pop standards and instrumental easy listening). CJWL's studios are located in the Glebe at 150 Isabella st, while its transmitter is located in downtown Ottawa.

History

The Jewel
CJWL was launched on February 20, 2006. It has a similar format to co-owned CKDX and CKPC in Southern Ontario, which was branded as The Jewel 98.5 FM. The station was licensed by the Canadian Radio-television and Telecommunications Commission in 2005.

The CJWL call sign formerly belonged to Haliburton Broadcasting Group's CFIF in Iroquois Falls.

On October 6, 2009, CJWL received CRTC approval to increase power from 485 watts to 1,100 watts.

Lite 98.5 rebranding
In May 2021, Evanov rebranded all Jewel stations to the Lite branding. The company also announced that CKHK-FM Hawkesbury, and CHRC-FM in Clarence-Rockland would drop the soft adult contemporary/pop standards "Jewel" format and flip to a country format.

CJWL wasn't affected by the format changes but was rebranded as Lite 98.5 on May 3, 2021.

References

External links
Lite 98.5

Jwl
Jwl
Jwl
Jwl
Radio stations established in 2006
2006 establishments in Ontario